Weber County may refer to:

 Weber County, Utah, United States
 Weber County, New Zealand

County name disambiguation pages